Somyot Poompanmoung (born 27 December 1954) is a former commissioner-general of the Royal Thai Police and current president of the Football Association of Thailand.

Following the military coup of 22 May 2014, Somyot was appointed to the National Legislative Council (NLC). Members are required to reveal their assets and properties to determine if they are "unusually rich". Somyot and his wife's net worth was reported to be about 355 million baht (roughly US$11 million). One government critic said that this raised "...questions about how a lifelong career in the public service could have made him a millionaire."

On 11 February 2016, Somyot was elected the new president of the Football Association of Thailand. On 3 June 2019, he was appointed as Asian Football Confederation Executive Committee Members to represent the ASEAN Football Federation.

Victoria's Secret loan
In 2018, Somyot publicly declared that he had borrowed 300 million baht from the fugitive owner of the Victoria's Secret Massage parlour while serving as national police chief in 2014 and 2015. Somyot's admission came after the Department of Special Investigation (DSI) revealed that its Victoria's Secret investigation found that the money trail of the business's owner, Kampol Wirathepsuporn, led to the former police chief. When asked why he borrowed so much money from Mr Kampol, he answered that his police job was a sideline career and he needed the funds for his other businesses, including a stock trading firm. Somyot did not report the loans in his assets declaration submitted to the National Anti-Corruption Commission as required during his term in office.

Awards
  The Most Exalted Order of the White Elephant
  The Most Noble Order of the Crown of Thailand

References

|-

|-

1954 births
Living people
Somyot Poompanmoung
Somyot Poompanmoung